Matías Omar Morales (born 5 July 1991) is an Argentine professional footballer who plays as a midfielder.

Career
Morales got his career underway with Quilmes. His first appearance in senior football arrived in the Copa Argentina against Atlanta, as he played the final twenty-three minutes of a win away from home after replacing Sergio Hipperdinger. He featured again in the cup, versus Ferrocarril Midland, before appearing in the Primera División for the first time in May 2013 during a loss to Vélez Sarsfield. In total, Morales played forty-one times in the top-flight; also scoring once in a fixture with Banfield in 2016. Morales spent the 2016–17 season in Primera B Nacional with Almagro, prior to playing in Primera C Metropolitana for Berazategui in 2017–18.

Atlanta became Morales' fourth senior team on 30 June 2018. He made his debut after coming off the bench in a 4–0 victory over Tristán Suárez on 18 August, with his first start arriving in September versus Acassuso. June 2019 saw Morales, off a promotion with Atlanta, move abroad for the first time, signing with Olimpia of Honduras' Liga Nacional. He appeared in league matches with Platense, Real de Minas and Real Sociedad as they won the Apertura stage, as well as making three appearances in the CONCACAF League, prior to departing at the end of December.

Career statistics
.

References

External links

1991 births
Living people
People from Quilmes
Argentine footballers
Association football midfielders
Argentine expatriate footballers
Expatriate footballers in Honduras
Argentine expatriate sportspeople in Honduras
Argentine Primera División players
Primera Nacional players
Primera C Metropolitana players
Primera B Metropolitana players
Liga Nacional de Fútbol Profesional de Honduras players
Quilmes Atlético Club footballers
Club Almagro players
A.D. Berazategui footballers
Club Atlético Atlanta footballers
C.D. Olimpia players
Sportspeople from Buenos Aires Province